Agdistis linnaei is a moth of the family Pterophoroidea. It is found in Tanzania and Kenya.

The wingspan is 14–19 mm. The moth flies in April and from November to January.

References

External links 
 Ten new species of Afrotropical Pterophoridae (Lepidoptera)

Agdistinae
Moths described in 2008
Moths of Africa
Insects of Tanzania
Taxa named by Cees Gielis